635 Vundtia is a minor planet orbiting the Sun- though this claim has been disputed.

References

External links 
 Lightcurve plot of 635 Vundtia, Palmer Divide Observatory, B. D. Warner (2007)
 Asteroid Lightcurve Database (LCDB), query form (info )
 Dictionary of Minor Planet Names, Google books
 Asteroids and comets rotation curves, CdR – Observatoire de Genève, Raoul Behrend
 Discovery Circumstances: Numbered Minor Planets (1)-(5000) – Minor Planet Center
 
 

Laodica asteroids
Vundtia
Vundtia
C-type asteroids (Tholen)
19070609